Leni Robredo, the 14th Vice President of the Philippines, has held various foreign, domestic, economic, and social positions over the course of her career. She has supported women's rights and women empowerment, human rights, ending endo contractualization, and policies that are pro-poor. As the chairperson of the Liberal Party during her vice presidency, Robredo was the leader of the opposition against President Rodrigo Duterte, taking positions that are contrary to that of the Duterte administration's policies, opposing federalism and charter change, the reimposition of the death penalty, warmer relations with China, and the war on drugs.

Domestic policy

Ferdinand Marcos' burial at the Heroes' Cemetery

Robredo opposed Duterte's approval of a hero's burial for the former president and dictator Ferdinand Marcos and has criticized the secretive burial as “like a thief in the night”. After members of the Supreme Court voted nine to five, favoring Marcos’ burial at the Heroes’ Cemetery, Robredo aired her criticisms through Facebook and Twitter, stating that “Marcos was a thief, a murderer and a dictator. He is no hero,”. She also criticized the Armed Forces of the Philippines and the Philippine National Police for being complicit and assisting in the execution of the burial.

Robredo's resignation from Cabinet 
Days after the first informal meeting between President Duterte and Vice President Robredo, the latter would be offered the top post at the Housing and Urban Development Coordinating Council through a televised phone call. Months later, Robredo would tender her resignation through a letter dated December 5, 2016, to President Duterte. This was after Duterte directed the Vice President to stop attending all Cabinet meetings.

Duterte's declaration of state of emergency 
After Duterte's initial declaration of a state of national emergency after terrorist attacks, the Vice President, despite coming from the opposition, respected this declaration for as long as it did not trample on the Constitution or fundamental rights. She remarks, “We reiterate our call that we bring to justice those responsible for the violence in Davao and at the same time, our bill of rights is followed and treated with utmost respect[.]”

Human rights and extrajudicial killings 

Robredo would speak out against the killings in the drug war, noting that while there is a need for an anti-drug campaign, rehabilitation of drug addiction is more important. Robredo has aired her concerns over the vigilantism and violence associated with the Duterte administration's war on drugs despite her support of the policy. She later condemned the violence committed, adding her opposition against the culture of fear that does not value human rights. Robredo would describe the war on drugs as a front to justify the violence. Robredo has insisted that violence against the perpetrators is not needed. Instead, it is the drugs itself that the country should be after with. In March 2017, she called for international investigations of the administration's method of conducting its war on drugs, opening up other abuses, such as battering up those who demanded search warrants and detaining relatives of the accused. After an impeachment complaint were filed against her following her statement, President Duterte defended Robredo, telling his allies to stop plans to impeach her because of democracy and freedom of speech.

Detention of Leila De Lima 
Opposition senator Leila De Lima would be implicated in the drug charges during her stint as justice secretary, with allegations of a love affair between her driver and bodyguard being exposed. De Lima had expected such charges to be filed against her by her former office, the Department of Justice, and called the possible arrest as “false and railroaded drug charges.” Vice President Leni Robredo opposed the move, describing it as being politically motivated. Robredo also alleged that the charges were driven by political opposition, rather than her being guilty of possessing illegal drugs. The arrest of Senator De Lima was not barred by the Supreme Court, with the court voting in October 2017 keeping her in jail. De Lima's appeal for reconsideration would be junked by the Supreme Court in April 2018.

Federalism 

Robredo opposes federalism, citing the varying levels of readiness of the regions that depend on the national government for income. She has questioned the form and model that the government intends to implement, what the program seeks to solve, readiness of the Philippines, the trustworthiness of the Constitutional Assembly, and the financial independence of local governments. In January 2018, her camp would express their opposition on the plan to abolish the Office of the Vice President under the draft federalism constitution. Opposition lawyer Christian Monsod stated in July 2018 that the transitory provisions of the draft could be used to nullify Robredo's right to succession. At that same month, Robredo again questioned the need for a transition to federalism.

A draft constitution was passed by the House of Representatives, in which Section 4, Article XVII on the Transitory Provisions set the Senate President, rather than the Vice President, as the successor of the President. This was proposed by Speaker Gloria Macapagal Arroyo and 21 other lawmakers. Vicente Veloso, House chairperson on constitutional amendments, cites the instability of the Office of the Vice President given the electoral protest filed by Bongbong Marcos. Robredo's election lawyer, Romulo Macalintal, questioned the basis of succession on a pending election protest. This provision would later be amended days later, restoring Robredo's role in the succession line.

Tax Reform for Acceleration and Inclusion (TRAIN) Law 

Critics of the TRAIN program were wary of the increase in fuel prices which would offset the savings of wage earners from their tax cuts when the first implementation of the program was signed on December 19, 2017. Inflation would rise to four percent in January, continuing to 6.7 percent by October 2018. Robredo called for the government to act on aiding the poor by fulfilling its promised Conditional Cash Transfer program with rising prices of basic goods, whether or not this rise is caused by the TRAIN law. Robredo also urged stakeholders to review the TRAIN program given the continuous rise in inflation rate which has affected the poor. Robredo and the Liberal Party suggested a review of the safety nets that would ease the effect of inflation on the poor. Amid rising prices, Robredo asked the Senate, House of Representatives, and President Duterte to certify as urgent a bill that will stop the added tax on fuel.

Social policy

Death penalty 
During the vice presidential debates of April 2016, Robredo gave her thumbs down on the question on imposing death penalty for the corrupt. In May 2016, Robredo expressed her opposition against the death penalty. This is contrary to President Duterte's promise to reintroduce capital punishment and to launch a war against crime. This reintroduction was to be applied for drug crimes, rape, murder, and robbery. Robredo cites that there have been no statistics that link diminished crime with death penalty and wrongful convictions of the death sentence.

Divorce 
During the campaign period in 2016, Robredo expressed her desire to fix the annulment system before tackling divorce. Her concern was to make it easy to access especially for the poor and marginalized. She also supports the use of physical and emotional abuse as grounds for annulment. Robredo would repeat her views in March 2018, stating her openness towards a divorce bill that even the poor could access. She adds that she does not want, however, people to take marriage for granted, stressing the sanctity of marriage.

Labor and contractualization 
On July 4, 2016, Robredo vowed to collaborate with the Duterte government and to push for more jobs and ending contractualization in spite of their political differences. One of the things she has proposed is the abolishing of end-of-contract (ENDO) practices, which prevents laborers from getting permanent jobs. Robredo has also called for both workers and employers to talk about a compromise between workers who cannot find permanent jobs because of end-of-contract practices and businesses who become less competitive and run deficits with a strict policy.

Women's rights 
Robredo supports feminism and equal rights, citing the role of women in inclusive development. She has repeatedly called for men to respect women and to stand up against misogyny and bigotry, stating that inappropriate and tasteless remarks have no place in society. Days before her inauguration as vice president, Robredo expressed her advocacy to work for anti-poverty and pro-women programs. In May 2017, Robredo stated the importance of economic improvements for women to give them greater freedom from abuse. Robredo helps women through the Angat Buhay Project of her office, which has overseen the growth and of their businesses. Robredo states the importance of quiet strength and collaboration, rather than leading, in promoting gender equality. She has also urged women to protect their right to vote, reminding them of the plebiscite on April 30, 1937, that allowed women to participate in the elections. Robredo opposes abortion, although she has stated that she is open to its decriminalization.

President Duterte has repeatedly released controversial misogynistic statements, with some directed towards Robredo. Natdem women's group Gabriela and Vice President Robredo would later on flag Duterte's comments as inappropriate. Robredo opined that the current administration has gone back to a culture of misogyny and bigotry, making women politicians disadvantaged at present. After Duterte's controversial rape joke, Robredo affirmed that rapists are the sole causes of rape and not pretty women.

LGBT rights 
In 2016, Robredo's administration stated on Twitter that they are against same-sex marriage, but that they support same-sex civil unions. During a CNN Philippines debate on February 27, 2022, Robredo stated, "I am all for civil unions," and that she was in agreement with Pope Francis's view on the subject.

Economic policy

Infrastructure 
During a business keynote on November 17, 2021, Robredo promised to encourage outdoor economic activity and to review and expand the Duterte administration's nationwide bike lane network, proposing to increase the bicycle infrastructure budget from  billion to  billion to install more bicycle lanes around the country.

Foreign policy

South China Sea dispute 

Robredo has called for peaceful public action to unite against China's militarization of the South China Sea. On May 22, 2018, Robredo and Associate Justice Antonio Carpio suggested that the government should file a formal protest against China's militarization of the area, after a long-range bomber was landed in the contested area. Robredo described the consequences of China's militarization similar to the devastation of the Philippines during World War II, as the assertion of China's nine-dash line means that the Philippines will lose control over its exclusive economic zone.

China–Philippines relations 

Robredo opposes the Duterte administration's policy to set aside the Philippines' arbitration award while pushing for better relations with the People's Republic of China. Robredo reiterates that China must be dealt with diplomatic resistance if it violates international law. She cites that smaller, less powerful nations could suffer from the aggressive expansionism of China. Robredo has also warned against falling into a debt trap as the government pursued deals with China. Robredo said that assessing the deals made by Duterte with China is difficult due to the lack of transparency on the part of the government. She stresses that while the Philippines is in need of financing, it should not give up its sovereignty. She adds that Filipinos should be more watchful on China's loans, which might come with consequences later on.

Overseas Filipino workers' deployment ban to Kuwait 
After news of widespread abuse of overseas Filipino workers (OFWs) and the discovery of a Filipina worker's body in a freezer in Kuwait, Duterte ordered distressed OFWs to be sent back. Duterte also banned the deployment of OFWs to Kuwait in February 2018, saying that he would ban deployment in countries that abuse Filipino migrant workers. Robredo supported the move of Duterte to ban OFWs from Kuwait, but urged the government to come up with a bilateral deal with Kuwait to protect the OFWs.

After relations between the two countries deteriorated with allegations that the Philippine Embassy took distressed Filipinos directly from Kuwaiti households, Robredo called for "decisive steps" to solve the diplomatic dilemma caused by the rescue missions done by the Philippine Embassy. President Duterte would later on lift the ban on May 15, 2018, through a memorandum of agreement signed with Kuwait on May 11, 2018.

References 

Political positions of Philippine politicians